Scilla bifolia, the alpine squill or two-leaf squill, is a herbaceous perennial plant growing from an underground bulb, belonging to the genus Scilla of the family Asparagaceae.

The Latin specific epithet bifolia means "twin leaved".

Description
There are two or rarely three lance-shaped, curved, fleshy and shiny leaves and the bases of the leaves clasp up to about the half of the stem (amplexicaul).

The flowers of Scilla bifolia are upward-facing, unlike the nodding flowers of Scilla siberica (Siberian squill). They bloom from early to late spring. The six tepals are deep violet-blue, more rarely white, pink, or purple.

S. bifolia has gained the Royal Horticultural Society's Award of Garden Merit.

Taxonomy

Subspecies
Scilla bifolia subsp. bifolia 
Scilla bifolia subsp. buekkensis  (Speta) Soó
Scilla bifolia subsp. rara  Trávníček
Scilla bifolia subsp. spetana  (Kereszty) Trávníček

Cultivars
The cultivated variety 'Rosea' has pale pink or white flowers.

Synonyms
Synonyms of Scilla bifolia include:
{|
|- valign=top
|
Adenoscilla bifolia (L.) Gren.
Anthericum bifolium (L.) Scop. [1771]
Genlisa bifolia (L.) Raf. [1840]
Hyacinthus bifolia (L.) E.H.L.Krause in Sturm [1906]
Ornithogalum bifolium (L.) Neck. [1770]
Scilla alpina Schur [1852]
Scilla carnea Sweet [1830]
Scilla decidua Speta [1976]
Scilla dubia K.Koch [1847]
Scilla longistylosa Speta [1976]
|
Scilla minor K.Koch [1847]
Scilla nivalis Boiss. [1844]
Scilla pleiophylla Speta [1980]
Scilla resslii Speta [1977]Scilla secunda Janka [1856]Scilla silvatica Czetz [1872]Scilla uluensis Speta [1976]Scilla voethorum Speta [1980]Scilla xanthandra   K.Koch   [1847]Stellaris bifolia (L.) Moench
|}

DistributionScilla bifolia'' is native to Europe and western Russia south through Turkey to Syria. The plant is found in shady places, woods of beech or deciduous trees, and mountain grasslands.

Gallery

References

 T.G. Tutin, V.H. Heywood et alii, Flora Europaea, Cambridge University Press, 1976

External links

RHS Plant Selector
IPNI Listing
Kew Plant List

bifolia
Alpine flora
Ephemeral plants
Flora of Europe
Flora of Western Asia
Flora of the Alps
Flora of Russia
Flora of Turkey
Flora of Syria
Garden plants of Europe
Garden plants of Asia
Flora of Ukraine
Plants described in 1753
Taxa named by Carl Linnaeus